Jingili may refer to:
 Jingili people, an ethnic group of Australia
 Jingili language, an Australian language
 Jingili, Northern Territory, a suburb of Darwin, Australia
 Electoral division of Jingili, a former Australian electoral division
 In the West African language of Gulimancema, it translates as “altar”. 

Language and nationality disambiguation pages